Alison Kharsyntiew is a former Indian football player and currently a manager.

Coaching career
After having his playing career cut short due to injury, Kharsyntiew went into coaching at the age of 19. He started his coaching career with Shillong Lajong, serving as an academy coach, before being promoted to lead the club's reserves in the Shillong Premier League. He led the reserves to the Shillong Premier League title in 2014. Kharsyntiew also worked as an assistant with Shillong Lajong's first-team, serving as assistant for Bobby Nongbet during the 2017–18 season.

Shillong Lajong: 2018–2020
Following the 2017–18 I-League season, Kharsyntiew was appointed as interim head coach of Shillong Lajong for the Super Cup, following the dismissal of Bobby Nongbet. His first game in charge was on 4 April 2018 against Indian Super League side, Pune City. Despite going down by two goals early in the match, Shillong Lajong came back to win the match 3–2.

Going into the 2018–19 season, Kharsyntiew was announced as the club's head coach. His first league match in charge was on 28 October 2018 against Aizawl. A brace from Naorem Mahesh Singh saw Shillong Lajong win 2–1.

Statistics

Managerial statistics
.

References

Living people
Indian footballers
Indian football managers
Shillong Lajong FC managers
I-League managers
Association footballers not categorized by position
1987 births
People from Shillong
Footballers from Meghalaya